Fabio Sonzogni (1963 in Bergamo, Italy) is a director and Italian actor.

Life and career
He has worked as an actor for fifteen years with directors: Luca Ronconi, Dario Fo, Gabriele Lavia, Mario Martone, Antonio Syxty, Antonio Latella.
Since 2000 he has been working as a director. On February 21, 2014 in Florence, Teatro Cantiere Florida, he is performing and directing Sunset Limited, by Cormac McCarthy. In July 2014 he is taking part to the Festival of Gibellina-Orestiadi, with his new play Come pietra paziente, acting Nabhia Akkari. In November 2014 he will perform The Road by Cormac McCarthy.
He is working on his next short film Reborn Baby and on the play The Face of Maria, monologue for voice and body of woman which will be set in London. In July he will be the artistic manager of the Siloe Film Festival, in Tuscany.

His short film Concrete Leaves, inspired by one of Mc Ewan’s short story, has participated in 35 international festivals and winning 7 of them, such as: Rotterdam Film Fest, Dresda Film Festival, Cork Film Festival, Genova Film Festival, Cinecittà Roma Festival and inviting to international reviews in New York, London, Paris, Madrid and Dresda .

Theatre productions

The Sunset Limited, by Cormac McCarthy, with Fausto Iheme Caroli and Fabio Sonzogni. Elsinor - 2013
Orgia, by Pier Paolo Pasolini, with Sabrina Colle (Sara Bertelà), Giovanni Franzoni (Fabio Sonzogni) and Silvia Pernarella. (Teatro Out-Off) Teatro Sala Fontana, Milano  - 2011–2012
Antigone, by Sofocle, with Cristina Spina e Gabriele Parrillo. Regione Puglia - 2010
Le Baccanti, by Euripide, with Giovanni Franzoni, Gabriele Parrillo, Teresa Saponangelo. Regione Puglia - 2009
C'era una nave..., by many authors, with Franco Branciaroli, Festival DeSidera - 2008
Ogni cosa era più antica dell'uomo e vibrava di mistero, (from The road by Cormac McCarthy), with Laura Marinoni, Festival DeSidera - 2008 
Medea, by Euripide, with Caterina Deregibus, prod. Teatro Stabile di Firenze - 2007
Edipo re, by Sofocle, with Franco Pistoni, Compagnia Elsinor - 2006 
Misura per misura, by William Shakespeare, with Gabriele Parrillo, Giovanni Franzoni and Cristina Spina, Compagnia Elsinor  - 2005
Cantiere: Misura per misura, by William Shakespeare, with Gabriele Parrillo, Giovanni Franzoni and Cristina Spina, SiparioFilmProduction and Fabrica, Ex Italcementi di Alzano Lombardo (Bg)  - 2004
Doppio sogno, by Arthur Schnitzler, with Gabriele Parrillo and Camilla Frontini, Teatro Stabile di Firenze - 2000

References

External links
Official website
Preview Foglie di Cemento 2002
Video Edipo Re, Milano 2006
Video play Orgia, Milano 2011
Radio interview Radio Popolare
Participation at the permanent seminar BDF 5.0 Bateson, Deleuze, Foucault
Interview, La Repubblica
Interview, Radio3 Rai
Video Orgia, Milano, 2012
Video Sunset Limited, Milano, 2013

Italian theatre directors
Italian male actors
Living people
1963 births